There have been two by-elections for the Manchester Central constituency of the British House of Commons:

1979 Manchester Central by-election, won by Labour Party candidate Bob Litherland
2012 Manchester Central by-election, won by Labour Party candidate Lucy Powell